Samuel Wootton Beall (June 16, 1807September 26, 1868) was an American land speculator, lawyer, and Wisconsin pioneer.  He was the second lieutenant governor of Wisconsin (1850–1852) and lost his leg at the Battle of Shiloh, as a Union Army officer in the American Civil War.

Early life
Born in Montgomery County, Maryland, Beall graduated from Union College in Schenectady, New York, in 1827.

Career
Beall moved to what is now Green Bay, Wisconsin, in 1835, where he made a fortune in land speculation, and was admitted to the bar and practiced law. In the 1840s, he settled in Taycheedah.

Between 1832 and 1856, Beall loaned the Stockbridge and Munsee Indians' delegations to Washington, D.C. some $3,000 for their expenses while they pursued claims against the federal government. He was promised one third of whatever they recovered, but when they won their case, he claimed and recovered only his actual expenditures.

Beall was a delegate to both the first and second Wisconsin constitutional conventions from Marquette County, one of only six men to do so, as most members of the first convention declined to serve in the second.

Beall was a Democrat and was lieutenant governor for Nelson Dewey's second term as governor, from 1850 until 1852.

During the American Civil War, he was commissioned as a lieutenant colonel of the 18th Wisconsin Infantry Regiment under Colonel James S. Alban. The 18th Wisconsin was organized in February 1862, proceeded to Tennessee in March, and was thrown into battle at Shiloh a day after its arrival. Beall was wounded in the battle and his leg was amputated below the knee. Colonel Alban was killed, along with the Regiment's third-in-command, Major Josiah W. Crane. After recovering, Beall was second-in-command of a prisoner of war camp in Elmira, New York, where the prisoners nicknamed him "old peg-leg" and accused him of a pattern of repeated cruelty and abuse.

Death
After briefly returning to Wisconsin after the war, Beall moved to Helena, Montana, where, on September 26, 1868, he was shot following an argument with a newspaper editor. He was re-interred in 1907 at Forestvale Cemetery in Helena.

Family life
The son of Lewis and Eliza Beall, in 1829, he married Elizabeth Fenimore Cooper, a niece of James Fenimore Cooper, and they had seven children. His eldest daughter, Mary Morris Beall, was the second wife of Levi Hubbell, a prominent Wisconsin lawyer, judge and Democratic politician in early Wisconsin.

Electoral history

| colspan="6" style="text-align:center;background-color: #e9e9e9;"| General Election, November 6, 1849

References

External links

1807 births
1868 deaths
Lieutenant Governors of Wisconsin
People murdered in Montana
People of Wisconsin in the American Civil War
Union Army colonels
People from Fond du Lac County, Wisconsin
Politicians from Green Bay, Wisconsin
Politicians from Helena, Montana
People from Montgomery County, Maryland
Union College (New York) alumni
Wisconsin Democrats
Wisconsin lawyers
19th-century American politicians
Burials in Montana
19th-century American lawyers